Canoe freestyle (also known as playboating) is a discipline of whitewater kayaking or canoeing where people perform various technical moves in one place (a playspot), as opposed to downriver whitewater canoeing or kayaking where the objective is to travel the length of a section of river (although whitewater paddlers will often stop and play en route). Specialised canoes or kayaks (boats) known as playboats are often used, but any boat can be used for playing. The moves and tricks are often similar to those performed by snowboarders, surfers or skaters, where the athlete completes spins, flips, turns, etc. With modern playboats it is possible to get the kayak and the paddler completely airborne while performing tricks. The competitive side of playboating is known as freestyle kayaking (formerly called rodeo).

Playspots

Playspots are typically stationary features on rivers, in particular standing waves (which may be breaking or partially breaking), hydraulic jumps, 'holes' and 'stoppers', where water flows back on itself creating a retentive feature (these are often formed at the bottom of small drops or weirs), or eddy lines (the boundary between slow moving water at the rivers' edge, and faster water).

Moves
Basic moves consist of front- and back-surfing, spins through any of the three axes; air screws, cartwheels and air loops (invented by Clay Wright), stalls with the kayak vertical on either end, and getting airborne (bouncing the boat on a wave, or submerging part of the kayak so that it pops out when it re-emerges). The playboater usually aims to stay surfing the feature after performing each move (as opposed to being washed off). More complex moves are made up of combinations of these moves.

These moves were more popular before short playboats were invented, but remain the foundation of several current moves.

Popularity

Playboating has grown in popularity in recent years due to innovations in boat design. Modern playboats are made from plastic which is much more robust than glass fibre or wood. Playboats typically have much less volume in the bow and stern than dedicated river-running kayaks. This allows the paddler to easily dip either end underwater.

Despite sales of playboats increasing, it is regularly claimed that participation in playboating events is decreasing (that "rodeo is dead").  However, events such as the National Student Rodeo have seen entries increasing year on year, and that interest in the sport is as high as it ever was.

Playboating is mainly done for fun, but competitions are also popular. Paddlers have a set time to perform as many moves as possible, and score additional points for style.

Visiting a playspot where you do not need to commit to a full river run to get there (which involves shuttling cars to the bottom of the river) is often referred to as 'Park and Play'. Playboating can often be more convenient and can in some circumstances can be considered safer than river running  – in particular if the play spot is in an accessible area as opposed to numerous whitewater runs which exist in remote and inaccessible (in case of injury or rescue) areas.

Etiquette and culture

Right of way
Playboaters still generally follow right of way conventions that are commercially established. The vessel upstream of a feature has right of way over a vessel in the feature. This means that if a kayaker is surfing a wave, and a kayaker or a raft is coming downstream, the surfing kayaker should give way to the upstream paddler[s].

This general convention however is disregarded in many scenarios present in playboating:
 If the feature has eddy access a kayaker approaching from upstream should eddy out and get in the line to surf the wave, instead of using their right of way to catch the wave on the fly as this is seen as 'budging'.
 If the kayaker is approaching a play feature that does not have eddy access they do not have the right to push a kayaker surfing on the wave off. They should wait until the kayaker flushes and then proceed down to surf the wave.
 A kayaker may not enter a play feature that another kayaker is surfing unless they are invited on for a 'party surf'.
 A kayaker loses their right to stay on the wave if they stay on too long. Generally rides extending longer than 2 minutes are frowned upon and sometimes a kayaker having a long ride will be 'dropped in on'.
 On some rivers that are heavily commercially rafted, rafts are privileged with skipping the line because they are on a timed trip and need to hit the wave many times in a short period. On other rivers, however, rafts that claim this privilege—especially without asking the other paddlers—are heavily frowned upon.
 Rafts coming downstream are given right of way because they are typically less agile to change their course than a kayak.  Also, they are larger and heavy which makes being run over not much fun.
 If the feature is at a specially designed site e.g. Holme Pier Point, Nottingham, England then the paddler in the hole or wave has right of way (excluding rafts).

Culture
Playboaters are a very diverse crowd, primarily because of the wide range of skill levels playboating can accommodate. Generally in regions where playboating is more popular than creeking or river running due to the surrounding rivers, beginners will enter the sport of kayaking in a playboat, or a cross over boat. This group of kayakers if often supported by either a paid instructor, club, or skilled paddling friend who often supplies instruction, gear, safety and clean up support. Beginners, club paddlers and lesson groups are generally friendly and welcoming to newcomers, and typically only paddle in warm weather months to avoid the need of buying expensive cold water gear.

The culture of playboaters also encompasses a group of kayakers who are called 'pro boaters' short for professional kayakers. These kayakers generally aspire to, or do, make money off of competitions, sponsorships, or media created on their playboating skills. There is a stereotype of 'pro boaters' to be elusive, self indulged, and wild; a stigma often enforced by the media the group produces. Professional kayakers generally range between the ages of 16 to 35, and generally do not make more than average income per year.

The last major facet of playboaters that do not belong in the beginner / group culture, or the 'pro boater' culture is the local playboater. This type of playboater is usually good to advanced in skill level, and generally is a graduate of the beginner or group culture scene. They are identified by a tighter knit group of friends, and their knowledge of the play waves in their area. It is not uncommon to see local boaters and pro boaters surfing advanced waves, with a distinct differentiation between the two cultures identified by their equipment, their lack or presence of media equipment, and general attitude around the feature.

See also
 International Canoe Federation
 Canoe sprint
 Canoe slalom
 Canoe marathon
 Canoe ocean racing
 Canoe polo
 Wildwater canoeing
 List of artificial whitewater courses

Notes

References

External links

 International Canoe Federation (ICF)
 Freestyle (competition) rules of the International Canoe Federation
 Playak Kayak and Canoe News
 Kayak Session magazine

Whitewater sports
Canoeing and kayaking
Canoeing disciplines